Jatiya Kabi Kazi Nazrul Islam University is a government-financed public university of Bangladesh. It is also known as JKKNIU. It is located at Nama para Battala, 2 kilometres west from Trishal Bus stand (Towards Fulbaria), some 22 kilometres from Mymensingh district and 100 kilometres from Dhaka.It is the first general university established in Mymensingh division. The university was established in 2006. At present more than eight thousand students are studying in the university.

History

An initiative to establish the university was undertaken at a meeting of the executive committee of National Economic Commission (ECNEC) in February 2004. Former Prime Minister Begum Khaleda Zia laid the foundation stone of the university on 1 March 2005. At a function on 25 May 2007, organized to celebrate the birth anniversary of National Poet Kazi Nazrul Islam, Begum Khaleda Zia inaugurated the university.

The university was originally conceived to be the first culture-based university in Bangladesh, but the University Act of 2006 made it a general university with a special focus on liberal arts education and activities.

Mohammad Shamsur Rahman was the first vice-chancellor of JKKNIU. Its first batch consisted of 185 students. The academic programme of the university started effective from 3 June 2007 with three departments under the Faculty of Arts (Bengali Language & Literature, English Language & Literature, and Music) and the single department Computer Science and Engineering under the Faculty of Science and Engineering.

Two more departments were established the next year under two new faculties: the Department of Accounting and Information Systems under the Faculty of Business Administration and the Department of Economics under the Faculty of Social Science.

Two other departments were opened in the academic year 2009–2010 under two faculties: the Department of Finance and Banking under the Faculty of Business Administration and the Department of Fine Arts under the Faculty of Arts.

Four additional departments were established in the academic year 2010–11 under four existing faculties, i.e., the Department of Dramatics under the Faculty of Arts, Department of Electronics & Communication Engineering under the Faculty of Science & Engineering, Department of Public Administration under the Faculty of Social Sciences, and the Department of Human Resource Management under the Faculty of Business Administration.

Location

It is located at Namapara Battala, about 22 km from Mymensingh city and 3 km from Dhaka-Mymensingh Highway, 2 km west of Trishal bus stand (towards Fulbaria). It is 100 km away from the capital city Dhaka.

The name of the place 'Battala' derives from the legendary banyan tree standing for years here at Namapara.

Faculties
The university has 24 departments under 6 faculties.

Institute
The university has an institute called 'Institute of Nazrul Studies'.

Academic buildings
The university has four academic buildings for conducting academic activities. The buildings are
 Arts Building
 Science building
 Social Science Building
 Business Administration Building.

Notable research
Ashraf Ali Seddique, departmental head of the Department of Environmental Science and Engineering and his team found high levels of uranium in Cox's Bazar.

Facilities

Residence halls

There are four students' hall in Jatiya Kabi Kazi Nazrul Islam University. Two of them are for boys, two for girls.

Male
 Agnibeena Hall (total seat: 228)
 Jatir Janak Bangabandhu Sheikh Mujibur Rahman Hall (total seat: 1284)

Female
 Dolon Chanpa Hall (total seat: 226)
 Bangamata Begum Fazilatunnesa Mujib Hall (total seat: 1175)

Health services
The medical center of JKKNIU named Bethar Dan, a Nazrul Literature, offers free medical service and free pathological examinations to students, teachers and staffs of the university and also family members of the teachers and staff.

Central Library 
The university has a five-storey modern and well-equipped Central Library.

Central Sports Field 
The university has a huge field for playing sports, which has been named 'Sheikh Russel Central Sports Field.'

Stages 
As the university is culturally advanced, it has 'Gahi Sammer Gaan Muktamancha' inside. There is also 'Churulia Mancha', which is located near Arts Building & ‘Joy Bangla Mancha’, which is located near BBA Building.

Cafeteria
There is a central cafeteria named 'Cafe Chokrobak'. There is also a cafeteria named ‘Cafe Chandrabindu’, near the BBA Building.

Transportation system 
The university has its own transportation system for the students. It also has its own ambulance service to ensure the health care of the students.

Sculptures
 Sculpture of Bangabandhu Sheikh Mujibur Rahman
 Sculpture of Kazi Nazrul Islam
 Joy Bangla Sculpture.

Monument
The university has a central Monument called 'Chir Unnoto Mom Shir'.

VC Bungalow
VC Bungalow, named 'Dukhu Mia Bungalow' has been constructed in a very pleasant atmosphere inside the campus in order to continue the constant supervision of the Vice-Chancellor on the campus.

Cultural activities
Various types of cultural events are held on campus. The birthday of Nazrul is the biggest cultural program of JKKNIU. In 2019 29–30 December, A two-day long cultural festival was arranged under the name Kuuasha Utshab. There were many segments like photography exhibition, painting exhibition, bookstall, indigenous traditional product stall, film show, recitation, literary debate & musical nights with famous and student band of the university that made a unique impression.

Active Organizations 
Career and Skill-Based Organizations :
EEE Club - JKKNIU

Political Organizations:
Bangladesh Students' League
Bangladesh Jatiotabadi Chatra Dal
Bangladesh Chhatro Odhikar Parishad
Bangladesh Students Union

Journalists Organizations :
Jatiya Kabi Kazi Nazrul Islam University Journalists Association
Jatiya Kabi Kazi Nazrul Islam University Press Club.

List of vice-chancellors

Gallery

References

Further reading

External links
 University Grant Commission
 Official website

Public universities of Bangladesh
Educational institutions established in 2006
2006 establishments in Bangladesh